Demi-Gods and Semi-Devils is a 1982 Hong Kong's TVB television series adapted from Louis Cha's novel Demi-Gods and Semi-Devils. The 50-episode-long series is divided into two parts, with their Chinese titles as 天龍八部之六脈神劍 (Demi-Gods and Semi-Devils: Divine Sword of Six Meridians) for 30 episodes and 天龍八部之虛竹傳奇 (Demi-Gods and Semi-Devils: The Legend of Hui-juk) for 20 episodes respectively.

Rating
The series averaged a rating of 30 points

Cast
 Note: Some of the characters' names are in Cantonese romanisation.
 Bryan Leung as Kiu Fung / Siu Fung
 Kent Tong as Duen Yu
 Felix Wong as Hui-juk
 Idy Chan as Wong Yu-yin
 Wong Hang-sau as Ah-chu / Chung Ling
 Chan Fuk-sang as Ah-tsi
 Sharon Yeung as Muk Yuen-ching
 Shek Sau as Muk-yung Fuk
 Patrick Tse as Duen Ching-sun
 Leung Shan as Dou Bak-fung
 Maggie Li as Mrs Wong
 Lui Yau-wai as Kam Bo-bo
 Bak Yan as Yuen Sing-chuk
 Bonnie Wong as Chun Hung-min
 Lam Kin-ming as Mrs Ma
 Lau Siu-ming as Duen Yin-hing
 Leung Oi as Yip Yi-neung
 Lau Kwok-shing as Ngok Lo-sam
 Yeung Yim-tong as Wan Chung-hok
 Kam Kwok-wai as Yau Tan-chi
 Cheung Ying-choi as Duen Ching-ming
 Shih Kien as Siu Yuen-san
 Kwan Hoi-san as Muk-yung Bok
 Lee Heung-kam as Queen (guest star)
 Ju Gong as Chu Man-lei
 Ho Lai-nam as Chu Dan-san
 Wong Man-yee as Ah-pik
 Ma Hing-sang as Tang Bak-chuen
 Eddy Ko as Kung-ye Kon
 Yu Tsi-ming as Bau Bat-tung
 Chiu Hung as Fung Bo-ngok
 Kwan Chung as Chuen Gun-ching
 Robert Siu as Bak Sai-king
 Gam Lui as Elder Chui
 Bak Man-biu as Elder
 Cheung Lui as Kau Mo-chit
 Bobby Tsang as Chung Man-sau
 Ho Pik-kin as Yuen-chi
 Kong Ngai as Yuen-fu
 Ng Yip-kwong as Sin Cheng
 Tam Yat-ching as Tam Kung
 Chan Lap-pan as Tam Po
 Yu Ming as Chiu Chin-suen
 Benz Hui as Tso Tsi-muk
 Yeung Chak-lam as Ye-lut Hung-kei
 Yip Ha-lee as Sweeper Monk
 Cheng Kun-sin as Mo-nga-tsi
 Wong Oi-ming as Tin-san Tung-lo
 Lai Siu-fong as Lee Chau-sui
 Lau Hak-suen as Ding Chun-chow
 Lee Sau-kei as So Sing-ho
 Lee Kwok-lun as Tufan prince
 Felix Lok as Hak-lin Tit-shu
 Kenneth Tsang as Western Xia king

Episode
Part 1: Demi-Gods and Semi-Devils: Divine Sword of Six Meridians 天龍八部之六脈神劍

Part 2: Demi-Gods and Semi-Devils: The Legend of Hui-juk 天龍八部之虛竹傳奇

References

External links

1982 Hong Kong television series debuts
1982 Hong Kong television series endings
TVB dramas
Works based on Demi-Gods and Semi-Devils
Television series set in the Northern Song
Television series set in the Liao dynasty
Television series set in the Western Xia
Hong Kong wuxia television series
Cantonese-language television shows
Television shows written by Wai Ka-fai
Television shows based on works by Jin Yong